The University of Nebraska-Lincoln Crew Club (UNLCC) is the intercollegiate rowing club at the University of Nebraska-Lincoln.  The rowing team is also known as "Nebraska Crew" in the Mid-West.  The men's team was founded in 1969 and the women's team in 1972.  The club's colors are scarlet and cream, with scarlet blades.  With the slogan "Row Big Red!", the Cornhusker men and women gladly row for Nebraska.

UNLCC has a boathouse on campus at 16th and "Y" Streets in Lincoln.  What was formerly an autobody repair shop, and then an empty building on campus, became the boathouse when the crew took over in the late 1970s.  Practices are held at both the boathouse and the lake, with many indoor rowing machines and one of the few indoor rowing tanks in the midwestern United States.

The  lake allows for 2,500 meters of rowing from the dam to the dock, and 1,500 meters from the dam to the end of the cove. The Lincoln West Optimist Club allows the club to store their boats, dock, and trailer on site year-round.

External links
 

Rowing clubs in the United States
Nebraska Cornhuskers